Microsphaera is a genus of powdery mildew in the family Erysiphaceae.

References

 
Erysiphales
Fungal plant pathogens and diseases
Taxa named by Joseph-Henri Léveillé
Taxa described in 1851